Maryborough–Biggenden Road is an  road route in the Fraser Coast and North Burnett regions of Queensland, Australia. The entire route is signed as State Route 86.

The Maryborough–Biggenden Road (number 478) is a state-controlled district road, rated as a local road of regional significance (LRRS). Road 478 is not continuous from end to end, being broken midway by a part of Brooweena - Woolooga Road (number 487) and by Boompa Road (number 479).

Route description
The road commences at an intersection with Ferry Street (State Route 57) in Maryborough. It leaves Maryborough as Alice Street, running north-west until it reaches the Bruce Highway which it crosses at a roundabout intersection. It then enters the locality of Maryborough West where it continues north-west as Alma Street, running parallel to the Mary River.

The road enters Oakhurst and continues west while the Mary River turns south-west. It passes the northern end of Mungar Road and crosses the North Coast railway line just south of Maryborough West railway station. After passing through farmland to the south of Wongi Forest Reserve, it veers to the south-west and passes through or beside several rural localities and Thinoomba State Forest before reaching Aramara, the site of a former railway station on the now defunct Mungar Junction to Monto railway line which opened to Brooweena in 1889 and to Biggenden in 1891.

It then runs west to Booweena before again turning south-west to Teebar where it follows part of Brooweena - Woolooga Road, and then west and north on Boompa Road to Boompa, the site of another former railway station. From there it continues north-west via Lakeside to Biggenden, passing to the north of Mount Walsh National Park. It enters Biggenden as George Street and terminates at an intersection with the Isis Highway (State Route 52).

History

Pastoral leases were taken up in the Fraser Coast Region from 1843 and European settlement of what is now Maryborough began in 1847, with a survey for a township done in 1850. It was proclaimed a port of entry in 1859 and a municipality in 1861, and soon became a major port of entry  for immigrants whose final destination was more accessible from Maryborough than from Brisbane.

In 1865, Cobb & Co expanded into Queensland and soon established a depot in Maryborough to service the flow of immigrants. While the Gympie goldfield was the destination of some, others were bound for the Upper Burnett Region or further west. A track suitable for stagecoaches was soon cut through to Biggenden and beyond. An undated Cobb & Co route map shows, as well as the route to Gympie, a coach route from Maryborough to the Shamrock goldfield near Degilbo, which would have passed through Biggenden.

Biggenden was founded in 1889 as a service centre for the nearby gold mining areas of Paradise and Shamrock, and for coach passengers travelling west from Maryborough. The arrival of the railway in 1891 reduced the usage of the road, but other factors soon led to increased demands for road improvements.

Settlements grew around the railway stations, resulting in more road-going vehicles, and some pastoral leases were partly opened up for closer settlement, further increasing the need for reliable roads. In 1887,  of land were resumed from the Teebar pastoral run for the establishment of small farms. The land was offered for selection on 17 April 1887. The opening of new farms led to the development of roads from Brooweena and Boompa to Teebar.

The missing link
It is almost certain that the stagecoach track followed a more direct route from Brooweena to Boompa  than the present road. The railway line certainly followed a more direct path. The former rail line alignment can be clearly seen on the satellite view in Google Maps. An unsealed road runs between the two villages, closely following the rail line. After the railway line was opened west of Brooweena, there was little need for a direct road link from there to Boompa, given the existence of an alternate route via Teebar that was being improved to service the farms in that locality. This situation remains to the present day.

Major intersections
All distances are from Google Maps.

See also

 List of road routes in Queensland
 List of numbered roads in Queensland
 War Memorial Bridge, Brooweena
 Brooweena War Memorial

Notes

References

Roads in Queensland